Besh Aghaj (also Romanized as Besh Āghāj; also known as Besh Āqāj and Bīsh Āghāch) is a village in Dughayi Rural District, in the Central District of Quchan County, Razavi Khorasan Province, Iran. At the 2006 census, its population was 351, in 97 families.

References 

Populated places in Quchan County